is a passenger railway station located in the city of Saijō, Ehime Prefecture, Japan. It is operated by JR Shikoku and has the station number "Y33".

Lines
Iyo-Himi Station is served by the JR Shikoku Yosan Line and is located 120.3 km from the beginning of the line at Takamatsu Station. Connections with other local or limited express trains are needed to travel further east or west along the line.

Layout
The station, which is unstaffed, consists of a side platform serving a single track. There is no station building, only a shelter on the platform. A ramp leads up to the platform from the access road. Bike sheds are located behind the station platform at the base of the ramp.

Adjacent stations

History
Japanese National Railways (JNR) opened Iyo-Himi Station on 1 June 1961 as a new station on the existing Yosan Line. With the privatization of JNR on 1 April 1987, control of the station passed to JR Shikoku.

Surrounding area
Saijo Saijo Seibu Park
Kichijō-ji, 63rd temple of the Shikoku Pilgrimage
Ishioka Shrine

See also
 List of railway stations in Japan

References

External links

Station timetable

Railway stations in Ehime Prefecture
Railway stations in Japan opened in 1961
Saijō, Ehime